Dark Skies is a 1929 American pre-Code crime drama film directed by Harry S. Webb and starring Shirley Mason, Wallace MacDonald and William V. Mong. Made by the Poverty Row studio Biltmore Productions it was an early low-budget talkie, set in a California coastal community. It featured the hit song "Juanita".

Cast
 Shirley Mason as Juanita Morgan
 Wallace MacDonald as Captain Pedro Real
 William V. Mong as Mr. Morgan
 Tom O'Brien as Pete
 Josef Swickard as Señor Moreno
 Larry Steers as Captain Nelson
 Tom Wilson as Mike

References

Bibliography
 Michael R. Pitts. Poverty Row Studios, 1929–1940: An Illustrated History of 55 Independent Film Companies, with a Filmography for Each. McFarland & Company, 2005.

External links
 

1929 films
1929 drama films
1920s English-language films
American drama films
Films directed by Harry S. Webb
American black-and-white films
1920s American films